Nathalie Perrey or Natalie Perrey (28 February 1929 – 25 March 2012) was a French actress. She is best known for her many years working with director Jean Rollin, appearing in several of his films. She has consistently worked as a film editor and script supervisor among other things throughout her long career.

Career
Nathalie Perrey has worked more than forty years in the French film industry, most notably as an actress of French cinema. She is seen in many small or supporting roles, and is most memorably known for working with director Jean Rollin in several productions over a thirty-year period. Making her film debut in 1969, Perrey was cast in Jean Rollin's La vampire nue, his second feature film. Subsequently, she received minor roles in several of his other films including La rose de fer, Lèvres de sang, ''La nuit des traquées, Les paumées du petit matin, Perdues dans New York, Les deux orphelines vampires, La fiancée de Dracula and La nuit des horloges.

Not only as an actress, Perrey has worked with Rollin on other occasions. In 1970, she was a production assistant for Rollin's third feature, Le frisson des vampires, a screenplay writer for Tout le monde il en a deux, an assistant director for Fascination and Les paumées du petit matin, for which she also worked in continuity, as editor on Les deux orphelines vampires and La fiancée de Dracula for which she served continuity, costume designer and script supervisor. Perrey has also received script work in Requiem for a vampire and La rose de fer.

Filmography

References

External links
 

1929 births
2012 deaths
French film actresses
French film editors
French women film editors